Worthen is a village in Shropshire, England approximately 13 miles west of Shrewsbury. The village forms part of the Worthen with Shelve civil parish, which includes the hamlet of Little Worthen immediately to the north-east and the villages of Brockton and Pennerley, in addition to several smaller settlements. It sits in the Rea Brook valley. To the south are the Stiperstones and the Bromlow Callow, known for the small clump of trees on top. To the north is Long Mountain.

The village contains the Church of England parish church, All Saints, a functioning Methodist Chapel, a primary school (now called Long Mountain School) with Eco-School status, a village hall built in 1977 and a post office housed within the local shop. Hampton Hall, a grade II* listed country house, is nearby.

History

Population
The population of Worthen has fluctuated throughout history since the first census was taken in 1801 recording the population at 1,799. A slight decrease followed in 1811 before a steady increase to the peak of the population in 1881 at 3,029. A slight decrease followed this until 1851 when a small increase occurred bringing the population to 1,965.  According to the 2001 census the population was 1,929 with a total of 775 households in the parish, the population increasing to 2,078 at the 2011 Census.

Employment

Worthen's population was predominantly characterised by labourers as recorded in the 1831 census, which showed a more organised classification of occupation, during this year there were 393 recorded labourers and servants employed in agricultural and non-agricultural sectors. A more detailed census was taken in 1881, which showed a greater working population of 437 male workers in mineral substances and 240 male workers in agriculture.  Mining was a major employment sector and well known mines included Snailbeach, a lead-ore mine, Perkins’ Beach lead mine and additionally grit and gravel mines.

Folklore
A local folktale tells of a family named Reynolds, who were driven out of their farm by two bogies who had the appearance of an old man and woman. When they left, the bogies managed to follow them to their new home by hiding inside a salt cellar.

Notable people
Henry Stafford, 1st Baron Stafford, died at nearby Caus Castle, buried at Worthen church.
Mary Anne Talbot, female soldier/sailor, lived at Worthen as child, also buried at Worthen.
Lois Baxter, actress, brought up at Worthen while father was local doctor.

See also
Listed buildings in Worthen with Shelve

References

External links

Hope hamlet, Worthen - 1980 news story of nuclear attack preparations

Villages in Shropshire